Alberto Beneduce (29 May 1877 – 26 April 1944) was an Italian politician, scholar and financier, who was among the founders of many significant state-run finance institutions in Italy.

Early life and education
Beneduce was born in Caserta on 29 March 1877. He earned a mathematics degree from the University of Naples.

Career and views
Beneduce was a socialist and was a leading member of the Italian Reformist Socialist Party. He was elected to the Chamber of Deputies in 1919 and 1921 representing the party from his hometown Caserta. Beneduce managed to connect with high finance figures and to collaborate with the Italy's fascist regime. He worked in different capacities, including statistician, teacher, demographer, agricultural and insurance specialist.

He was a university professor of statistics and demography until 1919. He contributed to the establishment of the national institution of insurance (INA), which was founded in 1912. He also headed the INA from 1912 to 1919. During World War I, he was asked to established an institution that would help the veterans in finding jobs. As a result, he involved in founding the related body, Opera Nazionale Combattenti (ONC).

Beneduce was appointed head of two state-run credit bodies: Consorzio di Credito per le Opere Pubbliche (Crediop) in 1919 and Istituto di Credito per le Imprese di Pubblica Utilità (ICIPU) in 1924. Until 1939 he headed both institutions. These institutions were later merged under the name of Istituto per il Credito Navale. In the period between 4 July 1921 and 26 February 1922 Beneduce served as the minister of labor and social security in the cabinet led by Ivanoe Bonomi.

In 1931, he was named as a board member of the Istituto Mobiliare Italiano. He also served as an economic advisor to Benito Mussolini. In 1933, he was appointed by Mussolini as the head of the institute for industrial reconstruction (IRI), being the first president of the body. 

In 1936 he was simultaneously president of IRI, of the public credit institutions Crediop and ICIPU , of the Institute for Naval Credit, and a member of the Board of Directors of IMI and of the National Foreign Exchange Institute while in the private sector he was president of the Italian Society for Southern Railways. He served in the post until 1939 when he became a senator in 1939, but he retired from politics and other public offices due to his health problems in 1940. 

However, he retained his membership on the boards of various companies until his death. He was an advocate of a company management approach based on the private-sector criteria and free from political influences. Beneduce was also a director of the leading companies, including Fiat, Pirelli, Montecatini, Edison and Generali.

Activities
Beneduce and Luigi Rossi recorded detailed statistics about Italian citizens, who had migrated to the US, but returned to Italy between 1905 and 1906. Beneduce was instrumental in the nationalization of life insurance in Italy. His activities in the finance sector of Italy shaped the industrial development of the country between the 1920s and the 1990s. One of his significant activities in this regard was the reorganization of the bankrupted Italian banking system. In addition, he was the mentor of many eminent financiers and technocrats, who reconstructed Italy after World War II. He also developed Mussolini's deflation policy.

Personal life and death
Beneduce had five children, three of whom were given names that reflected his socialist orientation: Idea Nuova Socialista, Italia Libera and Vittoria Proletaria. The other two children of him were Ernesto and Anna. One of his daughter, Idea, married Enrico Cuccia, a significant financier.

Beneduce died in Rome on 26 April 1944.

Awards
Beneduce was awarded the Grand Officer of the Order of the Crown of Italy on 16 November 1918 and the Grand Cordon of the Order of the Crown of Italy on 5 January 1922.

References

External links

20th-century Italian economists
20th-century Italian mathematicians
Italian Ministers of Labour
1877 births
1944 deaths
Italian Reformist Socialist Party politicians
Italian statisticians
Leaders of organizations
Members of the Senate of the Kingdom of Italy
People from Caserta
University of Naples Federico II alumni
Deputies of Legislature XXV of the Kingdom of Italy
Deputies of Legislature XXVI of the Kingdom of Italy
Recipients of the Order of the Crown (Italy)
Giornale degli economisti e annali di economia editors